The World Fantasy Awards are given each year by the World Fantasy Convention for the best fantasy fiction published in English during the previous calendar year. The awards have been described by book critics such as The Guardian as a "prestigious fantasy prize", and one of the three most prestigious speculative fiction awards, along with the Hugo and Nebula Awards (which cover both fantasy and science fiction). The World Fantasy Award—Short Fiction is given each year for fantasy short stories published in English. A work of fiction is defined by the organization as short fiction if it is 10,000 words or less in length; awards are also given out for longer pieces in the Novel and Novella categories. The Short Fiction category has been awarded annually since 1975, though before 1982—when the category was instated—it was named "Best Short Fiction" and covered works of up to 40,000 words. It was then renamed "Best Short Story" until 2016, when it was renamed to the "Short Fiction" category.

World Fantasy Award nominees and winners are decided by attendees and judges at the annual World Fantasy Convention. A ballot is posted in June for attendees of the current and previous two conferences to determine two of the finalists, and a panel of five judges adds three or more nominees before voting on the overall winner. The panel of judges is typically made up of fantasy authors and is chosen each year by the World Fantasy Awards Administration, which has the power to break ties. The final results are presented at the World Fantasy Convention at the end of October. Winners were presented with a statue in the form of a bust of H. P. Lovecraft through the 2015 awards; more recent winners receive a statuette of a tree.

During the 48 nomination years, 179 authors have had works nominated; 49 of them have won, including ties and co-authors. Only five authors have won more than once: Ramsey Campbell and James Blaylock with two wins out of four nominations each, Stephen King won two out of three, and Tanith Lee and Fred Chappell won both times they were nominated. Of authors who have won at least once, Jeffrey Ford and Kelly Link have the most nominations at five, followed by Dennis Etchison and Avram Davidson, who along with Campbell and Blaylock received four nominations. Charles de Lint has the most nominations without winning at five; he is followed by Michael Swanwick, who has had four nominations without winning.

Winners and nominees
In the following table, the years correspond to the date of the ceremony, rather than when the work was first published. Each year links to the corresponding "year in literature". Entries with a blue background and an asterisk (*) next to the writer's name have won the award; those with a white background are the other nominees on the shortlist.

  *   Winners

References

External links
 World Fantasy Convention official site

Awards established in 1975
Short story awards
Short Fiction